80-Page Giant was the name used for a series of comic books published by DC Comics beginning in 1964. The series was named for its unusually high page count (the typical page count for American monthly comics at this time was 32 pages). The cover price was initially 25 cents, while other comics of the day were rarely above 12 cents. Many of these "Giant" issues contained reprinted material, often including material from the Golden Age era of comics. Each issue would focus upon a particular DC character or group, such as Superman, Batman, or Jimmy Olsen. The 80-Page Giant format and numbering would later be used for special extra-large, reprint-heavy issues of their regularly published titles.

In the late 1990s, DC Comics began publishing 80-Page Giant specials which were special publications relating to a series (including Secret Origins, which had not been an ongoing title for years) and which were usually compilations. 

Around this time, DC was also publishing reprint-themed 80-Page Giant Annuals (also called "100 Page Spectaculars"), some of which were reprinted replicas of past Annuals and some of which were newly published reprint collections styled as the Annuals of a Silver Age title that had no Annuals during its actual run.

Number of pages
Originally, the Giant issues were all labeled 80 Page Giant. When the number of pages was decreased (usually to 64 pages), the "80 Page" part of the title was dropped and the title changed to simply Giant or DC Giant.

Types of "Giant" comics
There were four types of "Giant" comics:

Issues G1 to G15
These issues were published under the 80 Page Giant title. They had "80 Page Giant G##" on the cover:

80 Page Giant 01 - Superman
80 Page Giant 02 - Jimmy Olsen
80 Page Giant 03 - Lois Lane
80 Page Giant 04 - Flash
80 Page Giant 05 - Batman
80 Page Giant 06 - Superman
80 Page Giant 07 - Sgt. Rock
80 Page Giant 08 - Secret Origins
80 Page Giant 09 - Flash
80 Page Giant 10 - Superboy
80 Page Giant 11 - Superman
80 Page Giant 12 - Batman
80 Page Giant 13 - Jimmy Olsen
80 Page Giant 14 - Lois Lane
80 Page Giant 15 - Superman and Batman

Issues G16 and up
These were published under other series titles such as Justice League of America #39. In other words, 80 Page Giant #16 is the same as JLA 39. These had "80 Page Giant G##" or "DC Giant G##" or "Giant ##" on the cover (for example, 80 Page Giant G16).

The following is a complete list of the issues, ordered by date:
1965-11 80 Page Giant G16 Justice League of America 39
1965-12 80 Page Giant G17 Batman 176
1966-01 80 Page Giant G18 Superman 183
1966-02 80 Page Giant G19 Our Army at War 164
1966-03 80 Page Giant G20 Action Comics 334
1966-04 80 Page Giant G21 Flash 160
1966-05 80 Page Giant G22 Superboy 129
1966-06 80 Page Giant G23 Superman 187
1966-07 80 Page Giant G24 Batman 182
1966-08 80 Page Giant G25 Jimmy Olsen 095
1966-09 80 Page Giant G26 Lois Lane 68
1966-10 80 Page Giant G27 Batman 185
1966-10 80 Page Giant G28 World's Finest 161
1966-11 80 Page Giant G29 JLA 048
1966-12 80 Page Giant G30 Batman 187
1967-01 80 Page Giant G31 Superman 193
1967-02 80 Page Giant G32 Our Army at War 177
1967-03 80 Page Giant G33 Action Comics 347
1967-04 80 Page Giant G34 Flash 169
1967-05 80 Page Giant G35 Superboy 138
1967-06 80 Page Giant G36 Superman 197
1967-07 80 Page Giant G37 Batman 193
1967-08 80 Page Giant G38 Jimmy Olsen 104
1967-09 80 Page Giant G39 Lois Lane 77
1967-10 80 Page Giant G40 World's Finest 170
1967-11 80 Page Giant G41 Justice League of America 58
1967-12 80 Page Giant G42 Superman 202
1968-01 80 Page Giant G43 Batman 198
1968-02 80 Page Giant G44 Our Army at War 190
1968-03 80 Page Giant G45 Action Comics 360
1968-04 80 Page Giant G46 Flash 178
1968-05 80 Page Giant G47 Superboy 147
1968-06 80 Page Giant G48 Superman 207
1968-07 80 Page Giant G49 Batman 203
1968-08 80 Page Giant G50 Jimmy Olsen 113
1968-09 80 Page Giant G51 Lois Lane 86
1968-10 80 Page Giant G52 World's Finest 179
1969-11 80 Page Giant G53 Justice League of America 67
1968-12 80 Page Giant G54 Superman 212
1969-01 80 Page Giant G55 Batman 208
1969-02 80 Page Giant G56 Our Army at War 203
1969-03 DC Giant G57 Action Comics 373
1969-04 DC Giant G58 Flash 187
1969-05 DC Giant G59 Superboy 156
1969-06 DC Giant G60 Superman 217
1969-07 DC Giant G61 Batman 213
1969-08 DC Giant G62 Jimmy Olsen 122
1969-09 DC Giant G63 Lois Lane 095
1969-10 DC Giant G64 World's Finest 188
1969-11 DC Giant G65 Justice League of America 76
1969-12 DC Giant G66 Superman 222
1970-01 DC Giant G67 Batman 218
1970-02 DC Giant G68 Our Army at War 216
1970-03 DC Giant G69 Adventure 390
1970-04 DC Giant G70 Flash 196
1970-05 DC Giant G71 Superboy 165
1970-06 DC Giant G72 Superman 227
1970-07 DC Giant G73 Batman 223
1970-08 DC Giant G74 Jimmy Olsen 131
1970-09 DC Giant G75 Lois Lane 104
1970-10 DC Giant G76 World's Finest 197
1970-11 DC Giant G77 Justice League of America 85
1970-12 DC Giant G78 Superman 232
1971-01 DC Giant G79 Batman 228 
1971-02 DC Giant G80 Our Army at War 220
1971-03 DC Giant G81 Adventure Comics 403
1971-04 DC Giant G82 Flash 205
1971-05 DC Giant G83 Superboy 174
1971-06 DC Giant G84 Superman 239
1971-07 DC Giant G85 Batman 233
1971-08 DC Giant G86 Jimmy Olsen 140
1971-09 DC Giant G87 Lois Lane 113
1971-10 DC Giant G88 World's Finest 206
1971-10 DC Giant G89 Justice League of America 93

Annuals
The following "Giant" issues were the forerunners of the 80 Page Giants (80 Page Giant G01 was originally advertised in DC titles as Superman Annual 09):
 
1960 - Superman v1 - Annual 01 
1960 - Superman v1 - Annual 02 
1961 - Secret Origins v1 - Annual 
1961 - Superman v1 - Annual 03  
1961 - Batman v1 - Annual 01 
1961 - Superman v1 - Annual 04
1961 - Batman v1 - Annual 02 
1962 - Lois Lane v1 - Annual 01 
1962 - Superman v1 - Annual 05
1962 - Batman v1 - Annual 03 
1962 - Rudolph the Red-Nosed Reindeer v1 - Annual 
1962 - Batman v1 - Annual 04
1962 - Superman v1 - Annual 06 
1963 - Batman v1 - Annual 05 
1963 - Lois Lane v1 - Annual 02
1963 - Superman v1 - Annual 07 
1963 - Flash v1 - Annual 
1963 - Batman v1 - Annual 06
1963 - Superman v1 - Annual 08 
1964 - Sgt. Rock's Prize Battle Tales - Annual 
1964 - Superboy v1 - Annual
1964 - Batman v1 - Annual 07

The new 80-Page Giant (1998–2003)
DC published a number of 80 Page Giant specials within various current series. These began numbering with #1 within each series.

The following is a partial list of issues, sorted by title:
1998-10 - Adventure Comics 80 Page Giant 01
1999-09 - All Star Comics 80 Page Giant 01 (JSA)
1998-08 - Batman 80 Page Giant 01
1998-10 - Batman 80 Page Giant 02
2000-07 - Batman 80 Page Giant 03
1998-08 - Flash 80 Page Giant 01
1999-04 - Flash 80 Page Giant 02
1998-12 - Green Lantern v3 80 Page Giant 01
1999-06 - Green Lantern v3 80 Page Giant 02
2000-08 - Green Lantern v3 80 Page Giant 03
1998-07 - JLA 80 Page Giant 01 - The Green Bullet-Revelations
1999-11 - JLA 80 Page Giant 02
2000-10 - JLA 80 Page Giant 03 - The Century War #1-3
2000-01 - Legends of the DC Universe 80 Page Giant 01
1998-09 - Legends of the DC Universe 80 Page Giant 02
2000-12 - Nightwing 80 Page Giant
2003-xx - Plastic Man 80 Page Giant 01
2000-09 - Robin 80 Page Giant 01
2000-07 - Silver Age 80 Page Giant 01
1999-01 - Starman v2 80 Page Giant
1999-xx - Superman 80 Page Giant 01
1999-xx - Superman 80 Page Giant 02
2000-11 - Superman 80 Page Giant 03
2002-xx - Wonder Woman 80 Page Giant
1998-12 - Young Justice Secret Origins 80 Page Giant
1999-05 - Young Justice 80 Page Giant 01
1999-08 - DC One Million 80 Page Giant

See also
List of DC Comics publications

References 

Grand Comics Database
Mike's Amazing World of DC Comics
Fanzing , 

DC Comics titles